MotoRace USA (also known as Traverse USA, in Japan as  and in Spain as Mototour) is a racing video game developed and released in arcades by Irem in 1983. In North America, it was released by Williams Electronics. The player controls a racer who must travel on a motorcycle from Los Angeles to New York City.

Gameplay

Every level has two parts:
The first part uses an overhead point of view, in which overtaken cars cause the player's rank to increment by 1 per car. The current rank is shown in the bottom right hand corner of the game screen during each stage.
The second part uses a third-person point of view, in which the player must try not to crash into the opposite cars while a background relative to the city they're traveling to is shown (i.e.: if the player is reaching Las Vegas, then a few casinos can be seen in the background). Oncoming cars passed do not increase the player's rank.

There are five different stages that the player encounters on their way to the final destination (NY) before the game starts back at stage one as outlined below. These stages alternate from tarmac on stages one, three and five, to unsealed (dirt) roads on stages two and four. On the tarmac stages bonus fuel can be picked up by running over the gas can icon. There is also a "wheelie" section which when run over causes the rider's bike to do a wheelstand and gain bonus points. On the dirt road stages both fuel and points can be gained by running over the gas cans or the score amounts indicated on the playfield. On the dirt road stage there are several log bridges that cross water and a "jump" section on some bridges - riding over the jump icon results in a score bonus. On all stages there are puddles of water which, if ridden through, render the bike unable to steer for a short period of time and a tire squealing sound is played briefly.

Crashing into cars, road edges, bushes/trees, rocks or missing a bridge and riding into the water on a dirt road stage results in the motorcycle stopping and restarting; costing the player an amount of fuel. Running out of fuel prevents the motorcycle from going any further and causes the game to be over; but in the arcade version, the player can continue by inserting more coins (if necessary) and pressing START. Crashing can also result (especially in later levels) in being overtaken by cars which decreases the player's rank.

As the player reaches each city the rank achieved results in a bonus amount being added to the score and extra fuel added to the player's total.  The higher the position achieved, the more points and fuel is awarded.

When the player reaches NY, a sign saying "Viva NY" is shown while the Statue of Liberty waves its hand and "The Star-Spangled Banner" is played. After this, the game restarts with the player's score intact but the difficulty increases and the player has a higher capacity motorcycle (with correspondingly faster top speed).

Reception 
In Japan, Game Machine listed MotoRace USA in their July 1983 issues as being the most successful new table arcade unit of the month.

Legacy
An updated version of the game has been announced for release exclusively for the Intellivision Amico.

See also
 Racing Damashii, motorcycle racing game from Irem for the Game Boy, released in 1991 exclusively in Japan

Notes

References

External links

1983 video games
Arcade video games
Irem games
Nintendo Entertainment System games
Racing video games set in the United States
SG-1000 games
Video games developed in Japan
Williams video games